The Smith County School District is a public school district based in Raleigh, Mississippi (USA). The district's boundaries parallel that of Smith County.

Schools
Raleigh Elementary School (K-6)
Raleigh High School (7-12)
Taylorsville Attendance Center (K-12)
Mize Attendance Center (K-12)
Smith County Career Center

Demographics

2006-07 school year
There were a total of 3,125 students enrolled in the Smith County School District during the 2006–2007 school year. The gender makeup of the district was 48% female and 52% male. The racial makeup of the district was 32.45% African American, 66.43% White, 0.96% Hispanic, 0.10% Native American, and 0.06% Asian. 50.2% of the district's students were eligible to receive free lunch.

Previous school years

Accountability statistics

See also
List of school districts in Mississippi

References

External links

Education in Smith County, Mississippi
School districts in Mississippi